Henry Oswald de Villiers (10 March 1945 – 20 February 2022) was a South African rugby union player.

Playing career
De Villiers was born in Johannesburg and schooled at Dale College in King William’s Town. After school, he moved to the Western Province to do his military training and in 1965 he joined the University of Cape Town RFC and was soon selected for the Ikeys first team.

De Villiers played fourteen test matches for the Springboks. His debut was against  at Kings Park in 1967 and he scored 11 points on debut. His last test was in 1970 against  at Cardiff Arms Park. He also played in 15 tour matches and scored 54 points, which includes 2 tries, 15 conversions and 6 penalties.

Personal life and death
De Villiers died in February 2022, at the age of 76.

Test history 
 
Legend: pen = penalty (3 pts.); conv = conversion (2 pts.), drop = drop kick (3 pts.).

See also
List of South Africa national rugby union players – Springbok no. 418

References

1945 births
2022 deaths
South African rugby union players
South Africa international rugby union players
Western Province (rugby union) players
Villager FC players
University of Cape Town alumni
White South African people
Rugby union players from Johannesburg
Rugby union fullbacks
Rugby union wings